Minority language broadcasting comprises radio and television programmes for both national (including indigenous) and foreign minorities in their respective languages.

Under treaties like the European Charter for Regional or Minority Languages (Art. 11 and 7(1)d) states are obliged to encourage broadcasting in national minorities' languages.

Some examples:

Ethnic mass media
Broadcasting
Broadcasting